Chí Linh is a city in Hải Dương Province, in the Red River Delta region of Vietnam. In 2010, Chí Linh District was upgraded to a district-level town and in 2019, Chí Linh town became the second provincial city of Hải Dương Province. Chí Linh is a district in which six rivers converge, with features such as hills, mountains and forests. The capital of the city is Sao Đỏ (Red Star).

There are many temples and pagodas in Chí Linh, with many of them concerning Vietnam's National Heroes, including Trần Hưng Đạo, Nguyễn Trãi and Chu Văn An. Côn Sơn and Kiếp Bạc pagodas are famous all over Vietnam.

One of the best golf courses in North Vietnam, Star Golf, was opened in Sao Đỏ in 2003.

Phả Lại, the biggest thermal power plant in North Vietnam is located in this city.

As of 2019, the city had a population of 220,421. The city covers an area of 282.91 km². The city capital lies at Sao Đỏ ward.

History

Chi Linh city was initially called Bang Chau or Bang Ha and Phuong Son. Since 15th century, this area has been called as Chi Linh.

Climate

Transportation

Transport and transportation in Chi Linh are diverse. Visitors can take travel to Chi Linh by bus, taxi, train or private car from Ha Noi capital.

References

Districts of Hải Dương province
Cities in Vietnam